Freddie Joe Ward (December 30, 1942 – May 8, 2022) was an American actor and producer. Starting with a role in an Italian television movie in 1973, he appeared in such diverse films as Escape from Alcatraz, Southern Comfort, The Right Stuff, Timerider: The Adventure of Lyle Swann, Remo Williams: The Adventure Begins, Tremors and Tremors 2: Aftershocks, Henry & June, The Player, Swing Shift, Short Cuts, and 30 Minutes or Less.

Early life
Freddie Joe Ward was born in San Diego on December 30, 1942. He was part Cherokee. His father was an alcoholic criminal who was repeatedly imprisoned and his mother left him when Fred was three.  He was then raised by his grandmother until his mother had rebuilt her life and remarried a carnival worker. Before acting, Ward spent three years in the United States Air Force. He was also a boxer (breaking his nose three times) and worked as a lumberjack in Alaska, a janitor, and a short-order cook. He studied acting at New York's Herbert Berghof Studio after serving in the U.S. Air Force.  While living in Rome, he dubbed Italian movies into English and appeared in films by neorealist director Roberto Rossellini.

Career

1970s 
Ward became an actor after studying at Herbert Berghof Studio and in Rome. While in Italy, he worked as a mime. Upon returning stateside in the early 1970s, Ward spent time working in experimental theatre and doing some television work. He made his first American film appearance playing a cowboy in Hearts of the West (1975). His first major role came in the Clint Eastwood vehicle Escape from Alcatraz (1979) as fellow escapee John Anglin.

1980s
Ward played a violent National Guardsman in Walter Hill's Southern Comfort (1981). His first starring role in a motion picture was Timerider: The Adventure of Lyle Swann (1982). He then starred as astronaut Gus Grissom in The Right Stuff, in the action movie Uncommon Valor with Gene Hackman, and in the drama Silkwood (all 1983).

After co-starring roles in Swing Shift (1984) and Secret Admirer (1985), Ward played the title hero in the action movie Remo Williams: The Adventure Begins, which was directed by Guy Hamilton. The film was supposed to be the first of a series based on The Destroyer series of novels. Though the movie was well promoted and he appeared on several movie magazine covers, it only grossed $15 million.

Ward played in a few low-budget productions until he returned to major cinema in 1988 as a cop in Off Limits, as Roone Dimmick in Big Business, and the father of Keanu Reeves' character in The Prince of Pennsylvania.

1990s 
In 1990, Ward starred as Earl Bassett in the monster movie Tremors, as the American erotic writer Henry Miller in Henry & June (with Uma Thurman), and as cop Hoke Moseley in his self-produced Miami Blues (with Alec Baldwin and Jennifer Jason Leigh).  That year he also played an FBI agent in Dennis Hopper's film Catchfire.

After playing private detective H.P. Lovecraft in the 1991 HBO film Cast a Deadly Spell alongside Julianne Moore, Ward co-starred in the thriller Thunderheart, the Hollywood satire The Player, the mystery-drama Equinox and the TV western-comedy Four Eyes and Six Guns, for which he won a Cable ACE Award. He also did a cameo in Bob Roberts, starring Tim Robbins.

Ward's leading roles include Lt. Brann in the two-character-thriller Two Small Bodies, fisherman Stuart Kane in the Robert Altman film Short Cuts (for which the whole ensemble won a Golden Globe; both 1993), a dangerous criminal in the comedy Naked Gun : The Final Insult (1994), the sailor in the French-avant-garde-drama The Blue Villa (1995), his reprised role in Tremors II: Aftershocks and the special agent in Chain Reaction (both 1996). He also appeared as Sheriff Bud Phillips in Best Men, as Dave Reimüller in ...First Do No Harm with Meryl Streep (both 1997) and as Domenico Venier in Dangerous Beauty (1998).

2000s 
Ward was seen in many motion pictures, TV shows and videos in 2000. He starred in the action-thriller The Chaos Factor and appeared in the gangster movie Circus, the teen movie Road Trip and the horror sequel The Crow: Salvation.

In 2001, Ward was nominated for a Video Premiere Award as the best male actor for the direct-to-video-production Full Disclosure. He also co-starred in Joe Dirt, Summer Catch, Wild Iris, the mini-TV-series Dice and the comedic Corky Romano.

In 2002, Ward appeared in Sweet Home Alabama, Enough and Abandon. He had the starring role in Birdseye and signed in for the TV pilot for the drama Georgetown with Helen Mirren, but the series was never made. After roles in The Last Ride, 10.5 and Coast to Coast (all 2004) he took a short break from acting and returned as a guest in the TV series Grey's Anatomy and ER (2006 and 2007). He was next in the ensemble drama Feast of Love, the thriller Exit Speed, Management with Jennifer Aniston, The Wild Stallion DVD and as the boss Ashcroft in Armored.

Ward guest starred as Ronald Reagan in the French political thriller L'affaire Farewell (2009). He appeared in 30 Minutes or Less, guest starred in the TV series United States of Tara, In Plain Sight and Leverage in 2012. In 2013, he had a guest role in 2 Guns starring Denzel Washington and Mark Wahlberg.

Personal life
Ward married Marie-France Boisselle in 1995 and she filed for divorce in August 2013, but they reconciled later that year.

Death 
Ward died on May 8, 2022, at the age of 79. His family declined to cite a cause.

Awards
 1993: Special Volpi Cup – Short Cuts 
 1993: Golden Globe Special Ensemble Cast Award – Short Cuts 
 1994: CableACE Award – Four Eyes and Six Guns 
 2001: Video Premiere Award – Full Disclosure

Filmography

Film

Television

References

External links

 
 Fred Ward (Aveleyman)

1942 births
2022 deaths
20th-century American male actors
21st-century American male actors
American male film actors
American male stage actors
American male television actors
American people of Cherokee descent
Film producers from California
Male actors from San Diego
Military personnel from California
Place of death missing
United States Air Force airmen
Volpi Cup winners